
Gmina Rozprza is a rural gmina (administrative district) in Piotrków County, Łódź Voivodeship, in central Poland.

Villages
Gmina Rozprza contains the villages and settlements of Adolfinów, Bagno, Bazar, Biała Róża, Białocin, Bogumiłów, Bryszki, Budy, Budy Porajskie, Cekanów, Cieślin, Dzięciary, Gieski, Ignaców, Janówka, Kęszyn, Kisiele, Łazy Duże, Łochyńsko, Longinówka, Lubień, Magdalenka, Mierzyn, Mierzyn-Kolonia, Milejów, Milejowiec, Nowa Wieś, Nowa Wola Niechcicka, Pieńki, Rajsko Duże, Rajsko Małe, Romanówka, Rozprza, Stara Wieś, Stara Wola Niechcicka, Stefanówka, Straszów, Straszówek, Świerczyńsko, Truszczanek, Wroników and Zmożna Wola.

Neighbouring gminas
Gmina Rozprza is bordered by the city of Piotrków Trybunalski and by the gminas of Gorzkowice, Kamieńsk, Łęki Szlacheckie, Ręczno, Sulejów and Wola Krzysztoporska.

References
Polish official population figures 2006

Rozprza
Piotrków County